Martin Wagner (born 16 September 1986) is a German footballer who plays as a midfielder for Hannover 96 II.

Career
On 11 February 2019 Hannover 96 confirmed, that Wagner would join their reserve team, Hannover 96 II, from the upcoming 2019/20 season.

References

External links
 
 

1986 births
Living people
Sportspeople from Regensburg
German footballers
Association football midfielders
KSV Hessen Kassel players
Viktoria Aschaffenburg players
SV Eintracht Trier 05 players
SG Sonnenhof Großaspach players
Wormatia Worms players
SV Waldhof Mannheim players
SV Meppen players
Hannover 96 II players
Regionalliga players
3. Liga players
Footballers from Bavaria